Celso Grebogi  (born 1947) is a Brazilian theoretical physicist who works in the area of chaos theory. He  is one among the pioneers in the nonlinear and complex systems and chaos theory. Currently he works at the University of Aberdeen as the "Sixth Century Chair in Nonlinear and Complex Systems". He has done extensive research in the field of plasma physics before his work on the theory of dynamical systems. He and his colleagues (Edward Ott and James A. Yorke) have shown with a numerical example that one can convert a chaotic attractor to any one of numerous possible attracting time-periodic motions by making only small time-dependent perturbations of an available system parameter. This article is considered as one among the classic works in the control theory of chaos and their control method is known as the OGY method.
He was listed in the 2016 Thomson Reuters Citation Laureates.

Research areas

Grebogi has worked in the fields of dynamics of nonlinear and complex systems including chaotic dynamics, fractal geometry, systems biology, fluid advection and relativistic quantum chaotic dynamics.

Edited books
Together with Miguel A. F. Sanjuán (Rey Juan Carlos University, Spain) he was the editor of the book Recent Progress In Controlling Chaos.

Honours and awards 
In 2012 Grebogi was elected a Fellow of the Royal Society of Edinburgh.

References

E. Ott, J. A. Yorke Chaos, strange attractors and fractal basin boundaries in nonlinear dynamical systems, Science, volume 238, 1987, p. 585
E. Ott, J. A. Yorke Controlling chaos, Physical Review Letters, volume 64, 1990, p. 1196
T. Shinbrot, E. Ott, J. A. Yorke Using small perturbations to control chaos, Nature, volume 363, 1993, p. 411
M. A. F. Sanjuán Recent progress in controlling chaos, World Scientific 2010

External links
 University of Maryland Webpage
 University of Aberdeen Webpage
 Google Scholar Page

1947 births
Living people
21st-century Brazilian physicists
Chaos theorists
Systems scientists
Theoretical physicists
University of Maryland, College Park alumni
University of Maryland, College Park faculty
20th-century Brazilian physicists
Brazilian expatriate academics
Fellows of the American Physical Society